Svetlana Knyazeva (born 29 May 1970) is a Russian equestrian. She competed in the individual dressage event at the 2000 Summer Olympics.

References

1970 births
Living people
Russian female equestrians
Russian dressage riders
Olympic equestrians of Russia
Equestrians at the 2000 Summer Olympics
Sportspeople from Nizhny Novgorod